Harvey Hess (February 14, 1939 – July 18, 2012) was an American poet, librettist, educator, arts critic and theologian. His life and work are associated primarily with the states of Iowa and Hawaii.

Biography
Harvey Jason Hess, III was the first of three children born in Waterloo, Iowa to parents Harvey J. Hess, Jr. and Esther Miller Hess. His sister Lucy Schempp lives in Decorah, Iowa and Linda Hess in Spokane, Washington. Harvey received early music training, played flute in the Waterloo/Cedar Falls Symphony, and was an amateur countertenor. He earned a B.A. degree from McPherson College, McPherson, Kansas (1961); an M.A. from University of Northern Iowa, Cedar Falls, Iowa (1995); and studied at Bethany Theological Seminary, Oak Brook, Illinois (1962–1964). He also studied French language and culture at la Sorbonne in Paris (1957) and Japanese language and culture at the University of Washington, Seattle (1963).

He taught English, Creative Writing and Humanities courses at Hawkeye Community College (1992–2007) at Waterloo and the University of Northern Iowa in Cedar Falls (1989–2011). He was music and arts critic for The Waterloo-Cedar Falls Courier for twenty years (1987–2008) and, before that, the music critic for the Spokane Spokesman-Review (1984 - 1987). He edited the haiku column for the Hawaii Tribune Herald (1978–1983) and was the Big Island [Hawaii Island] correspondent for Ha`ilono Mele, the Journal of the Hawaiian Music Foundation (1977–1979) and had articles published in The Instrumentalist and Opera Monthly. He wrote the "Hawaii" entry for The New Grove Dictionary of Music and Musicians.

Harvey specialized in poetry with meter and rhyme systems, lyrics for musical setting, and Japanese poetic forms tanka, senryu and haiku. Five books of his poetry have been published. In collaboration with composer Jerré Tanner he wrote librettos for seven operas, three of which are of notable historic interest (The Garland of Kāne-first opera based on Hawaiian culture; The Singing Snails-first Hawaiian opera for youth; The Kona Coffee Cantata-first recorded Hawaiian opera), three choral symphonies, song cycles, concert arias and art songs.  His haiku have been published internationally, including in Japan. His collected papers are in Special Collections, Rod Library, University of Northern Iowa.

He received grants and commissions from the Hawaii State Foundation on Culture and the Arts (1973, 1975, 1979), the National and Hawaii Bicentennial Commissions (1975), Continental Harmony-administered by the American Composers Forum (1999), Summit Choral Society, Akron, Ohio (2000) and the Iowa Arts Council (2002).

Bibliography
Lyric Images, (with photographs by Gary M. Mason); private publication, Waterloo, Iowa 1962
Ouch Gonzui Sha; Gonzui Sha, Tokyo, Japan pg. 4 Vol. 3 No. 4, Winter 1979
Modern Haiku 10th. Anniversary Issue, Madison, Wisconsin pgs. 9, 16, 57 Vol. X No. 3, Autumn 1979
Orchid Art and the Orchid Isle, (with paintings and drawings by John Paul Thomas); Malama Arts Inc., Kailua-Kona, Hawaii 1982 
Hawaii Lyrics; Finial Press, Champaign, Illinois 1985
The Coffee Cantata (BWV211) and The Kona Coffee Cantata librettos; Malama Arts Inc., Kailua-Kona, Hawaii 1986 
The Singing Snails libretto; Malama Arts Inc., Kailua-Kona, Hawaii 1986 
The Garland of Kane libretto; Malama Arts Inc., Kailua-Kona, Hawaii 1987 
Skipped Stones – Faces in Time; Eight Pound Tiger Press, Cedar Falls, Iowa 1994
Th’Autumnal Sequence – Sonnets of the Fall (a collection of 53 sonnets); Eight Pound Tiger Press, Cedar Falls, Iowa 2002

See also
 American poets#H List of poets from the United States (H)

References

External links
 Albany Records
 Interview with Harvey Hess, July 30, 1993
 American Composers Forum, Continental Harmony
 Rod Library Special Collections
 Summit Choral Society
 Collaborator Harvey Hess

1939 births
2012 deaths
Writers from Waterloo, Iowa
University of Northern Iowa alumni
American male poets
American educators
20th-century American poets
McPherson College alumni
20th-century American male writers